Below are the rosters for teams competing in the 2003 World Junior Ice Hockey Championships.

Group A

Russia
Head coach:  Rafail Ishmatov

United States
Head coach:  Lou Vairo

Slovakia
Head coach:  Robert Spišák

Switzerland
Head coach:  Jakob Kölliker

Belarus
Head coach:  Vladimir Melenchuk

Group B

Canada
Head coach:  Marc Habscheid

Finland
Head coach:  Erkka Westerlund

Czech Republic
Head coach:  Jaroslav Holík

Sweden
Head coach:  Peo Larsson

Germany
Head coach:  Ernst Höfner

References
 IIHF Official Results – Top Division

Rosters
World Junior Ice Hockey Championships rosters